Brander Lake is a lake in Alberta, Canada.

Brander Lake was named for a Dr. Brander, who was a native of Edmonton.

See also
List of lakes of Alberta

References

Lakes of Alberta